Gheorghe Barbu (20 July 1968 – 31 October 2021) was a Romanian footballer who played as a forward and midfielder. After he ended his playing career he worked as a manager, mainly at teams from the Romanian lower leagues, with a short spell in the first league at Universitatea Cluj. Barbu died in his sleep on 31 October 2021 at age 53.

Honours

Player
Electroputere Craiova
Divizia B: 1990–91
Universitatea Craiova
Cupa României: 1992–93

References

1968 births
2021 deaths
Romanian footballers
Association football forwards
Liga I players
Liga II players
CS Universitatea Craiova players
FCV Farul Constanța players
CSM Ceahlăul Piatra Neamț players
FC Progresul București players
Romanian football managers
FC Universitatea Cluj managers
CSM Reșița managers
People from Moreni
CSM Deva managers
FC Unirea Dej managers